Pétur Guðmundsson is the name of:
 Pétur Guðmundsson (1786-1852), patriarch of the Engeyjarætt
 Pétur Karl Guðmundsson (born 1958), Icelandic basketball player
 Pétur Guðmundsson (athlete) (born 1962), Icelandic shotputter